Burrough on the Hill Manor is an 18th-century brick-built house in the village of Burrough on the Hill, in the civil parish of Somerby, in the Melton district, in the county of Leicestershire, England. It is a grade II listed building.

Notes and references

Sources
 Pevsner, Nikolaus (1960). The Buildings of England: Leicestershire and Rutland (Harmondsworth: Penguin Books)

Country houses in Leicestershire
Grade II listed buildings in Leicestershire
Somerby, Leicestershire